Erik Weispfennig (born 13 August 1969 in Iserlohn) is a German former track cyclist. He won the madison at the 2000 UCI Track Cycling World Championships with Stefan Steinweg.

In April 2019, he became the vice president of the German Cycling Federation.

References

External links

1969 births
Living people
German male cyclists
German track cyclists
People from Iserlohn
Sportspeople from Arnsberg (region)
Cyclists from North Rhine-Westphalia